Public holidays in Thailand are regulated by the government, and most are observed by both the public and private sectors. There are usually nineteen public holidays in a year, but more may be declared by the cabinet. Other observances, both official and non-official, local and international, are observed to varying degrees throughout the country.

All public holidays are observed by government agencies, while the Bank of Thailand regulates bank holidays, which differ slightly from those observed by the government. Private businesses are required by the Labour Protection Act to observe at least 13 holidays per year, including National Labour Day, but may choose the other observances they follow. If a holiday falls on a weekend, one following workday is observed by the government as a compensatory holiday.

Public holidays
As of May 2019, there are 19 annual public holidays adopted by the cabinet:

 Holidays regulated by the Thai lunar calendar—the usual Gregorian months in which the dates fall are indicated in parentheses. In lunar leap years, these take place one month later.
 Alcohol sales are prohibited on Buddhist holidays except in international airport duty-free shops.
 Not observed by the Bank of Thailand and usually not observed by the private sector.

Prior to 2016, there were 16 annual public holidays.  With the passing of King Bhumibol Adulyadej, the list of annual public holidays for 2017 was revised by the cabinet in April 2017. Coronation Day, which was previously observed on 5 May, was temporarily removed, but will be observed from 2020 onwards, with the new date of 4 May, which will be a double anniversary of the coronations of Kings Bhumibol Adulyadej (1950) and Vajiralongkorn (2019).

Two new public holidays from 2017 onwards are:
 28 July: King Maha Vajiralongkorn's Birthday
 13 October: Anniversary for the death of King Bhumibol Adulyadej
Chinese New Year, Eid ul-Fitr and Eid al-Adha are also observed as public holidays by government agencies in Narathiwat, Pattani, Yala and Satun Provinces (see below under ).

Bank holidays
Holidays observed by financial institutions (not to be confused with bank holidays in the United Kingdom) are regulated by the Bank of Thailand. These usually differ from government holidays in that banks do not observe the Royal Ploughing Ceremony day (Phuetchamongkhon) and the beginning of Vassa (Khao Phansa), but instead do observe 1 May as National Labour Day (see below under ). Up until 2016, a mid-year bank holiday was also observed on 1 July (if that date did not fell on a weekend). (Prior to 2007, the beginning of Vassa was observed as a holiday rather than Asalha Puja.) Chinese New Year, Eid ul-Fitr and Eid al-Adha are also designated as holidays for financial institutions in Narathiwat, Pattani, Yala and Satun Provinces if they do not already fall on a weekend or holiday.

National observances
These observances are regulated by the government, but are not observed as holidays. Actual observance varies, and some are only observed by specific sectors.

Other observances
Other observances, traditional and modern, are observed by various groups and communities throughout the country.

Observances regulated by the Thai or Chinese lunar calendars—the usual Gregorian months in which the dates fall are indicated in parentheses.
Alcohol sales are prohibited on Buddhist holidays except in international airport duty-free shops.

See also

 Thai lunar calendar
 Thai solar calendar

References

External links
 
 

 
Thailand
Holidays